Badesalz (literally "bath salt") is a comedy duo from the German state of Hesse, founded in 1982 by Hendrik "Henni" Nachtsheim (* 15 March 1957 in Wuppertal, (Germany)) and Gerd Knebel as "Badesalz Theater." They speak in Hessian dialect during their performances and sketches.

Nachtsheim was the saxophonist of the rock band Rodgau Monotones, Knebel a singer at Flatsch. They had several shows on German TV ('Och Joh' (ARD), Comedy-Stories (Sat.1), 'Badesalz' Comedy Central).

Their work includes numerous albums, several films, and a book.

Discography 
 1990 – Och Joh
 1991 – Nicht ohne meinen Pappa (DE: #70)
 1993 – Diwodaso (DE: #15)
 1994 – Alles Gute von Badesalz – BEST OF (DE: # 31)
 1995 – Zarte Metzger (DE: #9)
 1997 – Wie Mutter und Tochter (DE: #4)
 1999 – Voodoobabbbel (DE: #16)
 2000 – Dabrauchemergarnetdrübberredde – BEST OF (DE: # 96)
 2002 – Du packst es, Jutta! (DE: #16)
 2004 – Das Baby mit dem Goldzahn
 2014 – Alleswassesaufcedesogegebbehat!
 2018 – mailbox TERROR

Films 
 1989 – Das Super Dong Dong (VHS, Tourprogramm)
 1990 – Och Joh
 1996 – Abbuzze! Der Badesalz-Film, 2006 also on DVD Special Edition
 1999 – Badesalz Comedy-Stories
 2003 – Hammersbald (DVD, Tourprogramm)
 2007 – Badesalz

Tour Programms 
 ab 1985 – Das Super Dong-Dong
 ab 1992 – Der König und Frau Batz
 ab 1994 – uffgeplugged
 ab 1996 – se meking of
 ab 1997 – voll de Honig
 ab 2000 – Kubbba
 ab 2002 – Hammersbald
 ab 2004 – Das Baby mit dem Goldzahn
 ab 2007 – Dugi Otok

Books 
 Badesalz, Vaz Daz Den?. Möller Verlag, 1993, .

See also 
 German television comedy

External links 
 (German) Official Website
 (German) Official Fanpage from Badesalz

German comedy duos
Male characters in theatre
Comedy theatre characters
Comedy television characters
Theatre characters introduced in 1982
Fictional characters from Hesse
Actors from Hesse